Maersk Cape Coast is a container ship operated by Maersk Line, which measures 50,869 gross tons. It is named Cape Coast after the capital of Central Region, Ghana. The ship was named in Tema Harbour by Mrs. Ernestina Naadu Mills, the former first lady of Ghana on 18 July 2011. The container ship is one of Maersk Line's fleet of vessels that ply the West Africa sector.

Ship building
The vessel was built in Ulsan, South Korea by Hyundai Heavy Industries. The overall length of the vessel is 249.12 meters with a beam of 37.40 meters.

Capacity
The vessel has a carrying capacity of 4,496 twenty footer units of containers, including reefers and dry types.

Features
The vessel is fitted with a waste and heat recovery system, which can save 10 percent of engine power. As most ports in the West Africa sector are not equipped with container cranes, the vessel is equipped with four stationary cranes.

References

Ships of the Maersk Line
2011 ships